Who Can I Be Now? (1974–1976) is a box set by English singer-songwriter David Bowie, released on 23 September 2016, focused on the artist's "American Phase". A follow-up to the 2015 compilation Five Years (1969–1973), Who Can I Be Now? (1974–1976) covers the period of Bowie's career from 1974 to 1976 over twelve compact discs or thirteen LPs. Exclusive to the box sets is The Gouster, a previously unreleased album that eventually became Young Americans, and Re:Call 2, a new compilation of non-album singles, single versions, and B-sides that serves as the sequel to Re:Call 1 from Five Years.

The box set includes remastered editions of the studio albums Diamond Dogs, Young Americans, and Station to Station, the latter in its original and 2010 mixes.  (The remix of Station to Station, by coproducer Harry Maslin, was first made available on the 2010 deluxe edition of that album.)  It also includes David Live (in original and 2005 mixes) and Live Nassau Coliseum '76, a recording of Bowie's 23 March 1976 concert at Nassau Coliseum during his Isolar Tour, previously available on the 2010 special and deluxe editions of Station to Station.

The set comes with a hardcover book that includes photos from Eric Stephen Jacobs, Tom Kelley, backup singer Geoffrey MacCormack, Terry O'Neill, Steve Schapiro, and more, as well as liner notes penned by Bowie’s close collaborators Tony Visconti and Harry Maslin and a handwritten note from Bowie about The Gouster.

Track listing

Diamond Dogs (2016 remaster)

David Live (original mix) (2016 remaster)

David Live (2005 mix) (2016 remaster)

 On the CD version of the album, all the tracks are in the same sequence on two discs: disc 1 ends at "Watch That Man", disc 2 starts at "Knock on Wood".

The Gouster (remastered tracks)

Young Americans (2016 remaster)

Station to Station (2016 remaster)

Station to Station (2010 Harry Maslin mix)

Live Nassau Coliseum '76 (2010 remaster)

Re:Call 2 (remastered tracks)

Charts

References

David Bowie compilation albums
2016 compilation albums
Parlophone compilation albums